William Craig (1929 – September 22, 1997) was an American author of fiction and non-fiction.

Writing career
His first book, The Fall of Japan (1968), is a non-fiction account of the last weeks of the Second World War in the Pacific.

Craig's first novel, The Tashkent Crisis (1971), is a Cold War Era thriller about espionage and international politics. His second book on the Second World War, Enemy at the Gates: The Battle for Stalingrad, was published in 1973. Incidents from the history were used to structure the movie Enemy at the Gates (2001). Craig's final book was a spy thriller, The Strasbourg Legacy (1975).

Personal life
He married Eleanor Russell, who — as Eleanor Craig — was the bestselling author of four books, including P.S. You're Not Listening (1972).  They had four children.

Their second son, William Craig, is the author of Yankee Come Home: On the Road from San Juan Hill to Guantanamo (2012).

Bibliography
 The Fall of Japan (1968)
 The Tashkent Crisis (1971)

References

External links
William Craig at Penguin Random House Canada

1929 births
1997 deaths
20th-century American historians
20th-century American male writers
American male non-fiction writers